Pachim Dhuligaon is a village in Kamrup, situated in north bank of river Brahmaputra .

Transport
Pachim Dhuligaon is accessible through National Highway 31. All major private commercial vehicles ply between Pachim Dhuligaon and nearby towns.

See also
 Pachia
 Pacharia

References

Villages in Kamrup district